The 1963 New Zealand Grand Prix was a motor race held at the Pukekohe Park Raceway on 5 January 1963.

This was the first time the New Zealand Grand Prix was ever held outside of the Ardmore Circuit since 1950 and would continue to be the venue until 1973.

Classification

References

New Zealand Grand Prix
Grand Prix
January 1963 sports events in New Zealand